This article lists fellows of the Royal Society elected in 1964.

Fellows 

Frank Adams
Clement Henry Bamford
Sir James Beament
Russell Brain, 1st Baron Brain
Margaret Burbidge
Sir Arnold Burgen
Leslie Hugh Norman Cooper
Sir Eric James Denton
Dan Eley
Sir Leslie Fowden
Peter Fowler
Cyril Garnham
Thomas Gold
John Laker (Jack) Harley
William Hayes
John Riley Holt
Sir William Hudson
David George Kendall
George Wallace Kenner
Henton Morrogh
Rodney Robert Porter
Alan Robertson
Percival Albert Sheppard
Sir Frederick Stewart
Arthur Donald Walsh

Foreign members 

James Franck
Andrey Kolmogorov
Konrad Lorenz
Tracy Sonneborn

Statute 12 fellow 
Rupert Guinness, 2nd Earl of Iveagh

References

1964
1964 in science
1964 in the United Kingdom